Kruševo is a village in the municipalities of Sokolac (Republika Srpska) and Olovo, Bosnia and Herzegovina.

Demographics 
According to the 2013 census, its population was 168, all living in the Olovo part thus none living in the Sokolac part.

References

Populated places in Olovo
Populated places in Sokolac